Todd Richard Burger (born March 20, 1970) is a former professional American football player. Burger grew up in Clark, New Jersey and is a graduate of Arthur L. Johnson High School. He attended Penn State University where he played four years under coach Joe Paterno.  In his professional career, he played in 62 games and recovered four of his team's fumbles. He has a wife, Denise and two children, Todd and Lucy Burger.

In December 2007, Burger was arrested along with 4 others and charged on third-degree charges of promoting gambling and conspiracy to promote gambling. Burger was acting as an agent for the gambling ring. His job was to steer gamblers to Anthony Pecoraro for a percentage of the generated gambling money. The bets were placed through a website called www.beteastsports.com and it was connected to the gambling ring. Thousands of dollars of bets were placed illegally over the course of a month according to the prosecutor's report.

References

Arthur L. Johnson High School alumni
Chicago Bears players
New York Jets players
Penn State Nittany Lions football players
People from Clark, New Jersey
1970 births
Living people
American football offensive linemen
Players of American football from New Jersey